Eglinton station is a subway station in Toronto, Canada.

Eglinton station may also refer to:

 Eglinton GO Station, a commuter rail station in Toronto, Canada
 Eglinton railway station (Northern Ireland), a closed station in Northern Ireland
 Eglinton railway station, Perth, a proposed station in Australia
 Eglinton Street railway station, a closed station in Glasgow, Scotland 
 Eglinton West station, a subway station in Toronto, Canada
 Cumberland Street railway station, Glasgow, Scotland, originally called Eglinton Street
 RAF Eglinton, a former Royal Air Force air base in Derry, Northern Ireland
 RNAS Eglinton, a former Royal Naval Air Station in Derry, Northern Ireland

See also
 Eglinton (disambiguation)